Madabad (also Romanized as Mādābād) is a village in Sohrevard Rural District of the Central District of Khodabandeh County, Zanjan province, Iran. At the 2006 National Census, its population was 262 in 58 households. The following census in 2011 counted 235 people in 59 households. The latest census in 2016 showed a population of 178 people in 48 households; it was the largest village in its rural district.

References 

Khodabandeh County

Populated places in Zanjan Province

Populated places in Khodabandeh County